The 1997 Columbia Lions football team was an American football team that represented Columbia University during the 1997 NCAA Division I-AA football season. Columbia tied for fifth in the Ivy League. 

In their ninth season under head coach Ray Tellier, the Lions compiled a 4–6 record and were outscored 259 to 141. Jay DuPertuis and Matt Kuhn were the team captains.  

The Lions' 3–4 conference record tied for fifth in the Ivy League standings. Columbia was outscored 177 to 106 by Ivy opponents. 

Columbia played its homes games at Lawrence A. Wien Stadium in Upper Manhattan, in New York City.

Schedule

Note

References

Columbia
Columbia Lions football seasons
Columbia Lions football